Miha Blažič (born 8 May 1993) is a Slovenian football defender who plays for Ligue 1 club Angers and the Slovenia national team.

Club career
Blažič signed his first professional contract with Koper at the age of 17.

On 31 August 2017, Blažič signed a three-year deal with Ferencváros. With Ferencváros, he won four consecutive league titles, from 2018–19 to 2021–22. He also played in the 2020–21 UEFA Champions League group stage after his team eliminated Molde in the play-offs.

On 4 June 2022, he joined Ligue 1 side Angers on a three-year contract.

International career
Blažič played for all Slovenian national youth teams from under-16 to under-21, with four years as a captain. He debuted for the senior team on 2 June 2018 in a friendly match against Montenegro.

Club statistics
As of match played 11 May 2022

Honours
Koper
Slovenian Cup: 2014–15
Slovenian Supercup: 2015

Domžale
Slovenian Cup: 2016–17

Ferencváros
Nemzeti Bajnokság I: 2018–19, 2019–20, 2020–21,  2021–22
Magyar Kupa: 2021–22

References

External links
NZS profile 

1993 births
Living people
Sportspeople from Koper
Association football defenders
Slovenian footballers
Slovenia youth international footballers
Slovenia under-21 international footballers
Slovenia international footballers
Slovenian expatriate footballers
FC Koper players
NK Domžale players
Ferencvárosi TC footballers
Angers SCO players
Slovenian PrvaLiga players
Nemzeti Bajnokság I players
Ligue 1 players
Slovenian expatriate sportspeople in Hungary
Expatriate footballers in Hungary
Slovenian expatriate sportspeople in France
Expatriate footballers in France